The Barbados men's national field hockey team represents Barbados in international field hockey competitions.

Tournament history

Pan American Games
 1979 – 7th place
 1983 – 9th place
 1987 – 6th place
 1991 – 4th place
 2003 – 7th place
 2011 – 8th place

Pan American Cup
 2000 – 9th place

Central American and Caribbean Games
 1982 – 
 1986 – 4th place
 1993 – 4th place
 1998 – 4th place
 2002 – 
 2006 – 5th place
 2010 – 
 2014 – 4th place
 2018 – 5th place
 2022 – Qualified

Commonwealth Games
 2002 – 8th place

Hockey World League
 2012–13 – Unranked
 2014–15 – Unranked
 2016–17 – 34th place

See also
Barbados women's national field hockey team

References

External links
FIH profile

Field hockey
Barbados
national team
Men's sport in Barbados